Ellyn Kaschak (born June 23, 1943), is an American clinical psychologist, Professor of Psychology at San Jose State University. She is one of the founders of the field of feminist psychology, which she has practiced and taught since 1972.  Her many publications, including Engendered Lives: A New Psychology of Women's Experience (Kaschak, 1993), and Sight Unseen: Gender and Race through Blind Eyes (Kaschak, 2015), have helped define the field. She was the editor of the academic journal, Women & Therapy. for twenty years.

Education 

Ellyn Kaschak was born in Brooklyn, New York and graduated from Harpur College of the State University of New York with a B.A. in Russian language and literature (1965). She gained her M.A. from George Washington University in 1968, and in 1974, she received a Ph.D. in Clinical Psychology from the Ohio State University. She also completed an internship at the Palo Alto Veterans Administration Hospital.

Career 

Kaschak has been Professor of Psychology at San Jose State University since 1974 and is currently Professor Emerita. At San Jose State University, she has served as Chairperson of the graduate program in Marriage, Family and Child Counseling and Director of the university's Family Counseling Service.

She has also taught at Universidad Nacional and The United Nations University for Peace in Costa Rica, where she currently lives.   She is the founder of the Ellyn Uram Kaschak Institute for Social Justice for Women and Girls at SUNY at Binghamton.

She has served as the Chair of the Feminist Therapy Institute, the Committee on Women in Psychology and the Committee on Sexual and Gender Diversity of the American Psychological Association (APA) and is a Fellow of Division 35 (the Psychology of Women), Division 12 (Clinical Psychology), Division 44 (Lesbian, Gay, and Bisexual Issues), Division 45 (Ethnic Minority Issues), and Division 52 (International Psychology) of the APA.

Awards 
Distinguished Career Award of the Association for Women in Psychology (2019), and the Feminist Therapy Institute Award for Outstanding Contribution to Feminist Psychology.

Select works

Books 
 
 
 
 
 
 
 
 
 
 
 
 
Kaschak, E. (2015), Sight Unseen: Gender and Race through Blind Eyes. Columbia University Press, New York.

References

External links
San Jose State University, Emeritus Psychology Faculty page.

21st-century American psychologists
American women psychologists
Academic journal editors
Harpur College alumni
George Washington University alumni
Ohio State University alumni
San Jose State University faculty
1943 births
Living people
American feminists
20th-century American psychologists